Oliva porphyria, common name the tent olive, is a species of sea snail, a marine gastropod mollusk in the family Olividae, the olives. Its shell pattern has been studied as an example of a Turing pattern that can be modeled with cellular automata.

Subspecies
 Oliva porphyria erythrostoma F.C. Meuschen, 1787

Description
The length of the shell can vary between 30 mm and 135 mm. The flesh-colored shell is angularly marked with some large, and many small, crowded, deep chestnut lines. The fasciole is tinged with violet, with chestnut maculations. The interior of the aperture and columella is yellowish flesh-color. Sometimes the shell is very faintly, broadly two- or three-banded with bluish ash.

Distribution
This marine species occurs in the Panama Zone to Western Mexico (Gulf of California), to Northern Peru.

Bibliography
 Rowland F. Zeigler - Olive Shells of the World
 Günther Sterba - Olividae - A Collector's Guide
 Edward J. Petuch, Dennis M. Sargent - Atlas of the Living Olive Shells of the World - Coastal Education & Research Foundation (U.S.)
 Bernard Tursch, Dietmar Greifeneder - Oliva shells: the genus Oliva and the species problem
 Graham Saunders - Spotters Guide to Shells
 Angeline Myra Keen - Sea Shells of Tropical West America - Stanford University Press, 1971
 Jerome M. Eisenberg - Collector's guide to Seashells of the World
 A. Robin - Encyclopedia of Marine Gastropods
 H. P. Oliver - Hamlyn Guide to Shells of the World
 R. Tucker Abbott and S. Peter Dance - Compendium of Seashells 
 S. Peter Dance - Eyewitness handbooks - Shells

References

External links
 Rajiv Sobhee The mathematics of patterning
 Ist Mathematik die Sprache der Natur?

porphyria